Zilkha is a surname. Notable people with the surname include:

Donald Zilkha (born 1951), American financier, son of Ezra
Ezra Zilkha (1925-2019), American financier
Geila Zilkha (born 1969), Japanese singer
Khedouri Zilkha (1884–1956), Iraqi banker
Maurice Zilkha (1918-1964), Iraqi banker
Selim Zilkha (born 1927), Iraqi businessman